Miss Europe 1994 was the 49th edition of the Miss Europe pageant and the 38th edition under the Mondial Events Organization. It was held in Istanbul, Turkey on September 30, 1994. Lilach Ben-Simon of Israel, was crowned Miss Europe 1994 by out going titleholder Arzum Onan of Turkey.

Results

Placements

Special awards

Contestants 

 - Lida Reka
 - Alexandra Gnezda
 - Katia Defraeye
 - Danaila Dimitrova
 - Kateřina Vondrová
 - D. Baden Nielsen
 - Amanda Louise Johnson
 - Kristi Meriväli
 - Tiia Annaleena Litja
 -  Carole Moretto
 - Alexandra Klim
 - Johanna Papadimitriou
 - Pamela van der Berg
 - Zita Paikovics (Paukovics)
 - Margrét Skúladóttir Sigurz
 - Tara Logan
 - Lilach Ben-Simon
 - Stefania Del Zotto
 - Evija Zēberga
 - Loreta Brusokaitė
 - Sandy Wagner
 - Neolene Micallef
 - Line Skavas
 - Serafina Mąkowska
 - Mónica Sofia Borges Pereira
 - Roberta Anastase
 - Olga Sysoyeva
 - Sarah MacRae
 - Nikoleta Mészarosová
 - Laura Marina Vicente Barreto
 - Johanna Lundgren
 - Didem Uzel
 - Nataliy Shvachiy

Notes

Withdrawals

Debuts/Returns
 - Was represented in 1927 as the Baltic States. This is the first time Latvia is competing as its own country.

Returns

References

External links 
 

Miss Europe
1994 beauty pageants
1994 in Turkey